The human rights situation in Korea is the subject of two separate articles:
The human rights in North Korea
The human rights in South Korea

Korea